Private John Dame (1784–?) was a member of the Lewis and Clark Expedition. Born in 1784 at Pallingham, New Hampshire, he was five feet nine inches in height and had blue eyes, light hair, and a fair complexion. He was recruited from Captain Amos Stoddard's Company at Kaskaskia, Illinois. He was mentioned in the journals because he killed a pelican on August 7, while en route up the Missouri River.

References

Lewis and Clark Expedition people
1784 births
Year of death missing